The Oust is a river in Brittany, France, right tributary of the Vilaine. Its source is in the hills between Corlay and Quintin. It flows generally southeast, through the following départements and towns:

 Côtes-d'Armor: Uzel
 Morbihan: Rohan, Josselin, Malestroit
 Ille-et-Vilaine: Redon

The Oust flows into the river Vilaine in Redon. The part of the Oust between Rohan and Redon has been made navigable for small ships, and forms part of the Canal de Nantes à Brest.

The rivers Aff, Arz and Ninian are among its tributaries.

References

Rivers of France
Rivers of Brittany
Rivers of Côtes-d'Armor
Rivers of Ille-et-Vilaine
Rivers of Morbihan
Brittany region articles needing translation from French Wikipedia